Andreas Dietziker (born 15 October 1982) is a Swiss former cyclist. He rode in the 2012 Giro d'Italia.

Major results

2003
 1st Overall Tour de Berlin
1st Stage 2
2004
 1st  Time trial, National Under-23 Road Championships
 2nd Giro del Canavese
2007
 1st Giro del Mendrisiotto
 1st Stage 5 Rheinland-Pfalz Rundfahrt
2008
 2nd Bayern-Rundfahrt
 3rd Time trial, National Road Championships
2010
 1st Giro del Mendrisiotto
2012
 1st Stage 2b (TTT) Settimana internazionale di Coppi e Bartali

References

External links

1982 births
Living people
Swiss male cyclists
20th-century Swiss people
21st-century Swiss people